Thalawathugoda West Grama Niladhari Division is a Grama Niladhari Division of the Maharagama Divisional Secretariat of Colombo District of Western Province, Sri Lanka. It has Grama Niladhari Division Code 493A.

Thalawathugoda are located within, nearby or associated with Thalawathugoda West.

Thalawathugoda West is a surrounded by the Pahalawela, Kalalgoda, Madiwela, Pamunuwa, Polwatta, Thalapathpitiya and Thalawathugoda East Grama Niladhari Divisions.

Demographics

Ethnicity 
The Thalawathugoda West Grama Niladhari Division has a Sinhalese majority (96.0%). In comparison, the Maharagama Divisional Secretariat (which contains the Thalawathugoda West Grama Niladhari Division) has a Sinhalese majority (95.7%)

Religion 
The Thalawathugoda West Grama Niladhari Division has a Buddhist majority (92.2%). In comparison, the Maharagama Divisional Secretariat (which contains the Thalawathugoda West Grama Niladhari Division) has a Buddhist majority (92.0%)

References 

Grama Niladhari Divisions of Maharagama Divisional Secretariat